Peterson Lake is a lake in Clearwater County, Minnesota, in the United States.

Peterson Lake was named for Nels M. Peterson, who owned land there.

See also
List of lakes in Minnesota

References

Lakes of Minnesota
Lakes of Clearwater County, Minnesota